Shark Zone is a 2003 direct-to-video horror film directed by Danny Lerner and released October 14, 2003. When a shoal of ferocious great white sharks threatens a small breach community, Jimmy (who encountered the deadly sharks a decade prior and was left the sole survivor of his diving crew) must hunt them down all the while dealing with a group of criminals who sees a priceless treasure that happens to be at the bottom of the ocean as well as in the breeding grounds for the sharks.

Plot
A group of divers go searching for gold in a sunken ship. Among them are Jimmy Wagner, and his father. However, a group of great white sharks attack the group, leaving Jimmy as the only survivor. Ten years later, Jimmy has married a woman named Carrie, and has a son Danny, although is still guilty over his father's death, and has developed a fear of sharks. A man named Volkoff asks him to help him search for gold in the same ship, although Jimmy declines the offer. The town mayor, John Cortell, asks Jimmy to patrol the beaches for sharks to prepare for an upcoming beach party. Jimmy agrees to do so, eventually witnessing a shark attack that claims the lives of several people.

Assigned to kill the sharks, Jimmy, and a group of his diver friends go shark hunting in order to kill them. However, the sharks attack them, and eat everybody except Jimmy. At a party one night, two young adults are eaten, and Jimmy rejects another offer from Volkoff. Jimmy, and one of his partners return to patrolling the beaches, although after another shark attack claims the lives of three teenagers, Jimmy's partner manages to tag one of the sharks with a tracking device. Jimmy, and his partner use the tracking device to track the sharks, eventually blowing several of them up with bombs from a helicopter. He is still uncertain whether or not they were all killed. Jimmy is called, and threatened by Volkoff unless he meets him in private.

Volkoff once again asks Jimmy to help him locate the ship, although he refuses once more. As a result, Volkoff has his henchmen kidnap Danny, forcing Jimmy to arrive at the boat where Volkoff, and Danny are. Jimmy helps three of Volkoff's men locate the ship, although they're all quickly killed by sharks. Jimmy, and another henchman then go, although Jimmy stabs the henchman with a knife before returning to the ship, and engaging in a fight with Volkoff. During the fight, an electric cable is damaged, creating a fire, and trapping Danny, and Jimmy is shot, although he still manages to gain the upper hand, and knock Volkoff overboard, resulting in him being eaten by the sharks. Jimmy rescues Danny, and the two use a motorboat to escape the ship as it explodes. Jimmy, and Danny then return to the mainland, and reunite with Carrie.

Cast
 Dean Cochran as Jimmy Wagner
 Alan Austin as Mayor John Cortell
 Brandi Sherwood as Carrie Wagner
 Velizar Binev as Volkoff
 Luke Leavitt as Danny Wagner

Reception
The film has a rating of 19% on review aggregator website Rotten Tomatoes.

See also
 List of killer shark films

References

External links
 
 

2003 films
2003 direct-to-video films
2003 horror films
2000s horror thriller films
Nu Image films
Films about sharks
Shark attacks in fiction
Films about shark attacks
Films directed by Danny Lerner
Films produced by Boaz Davidson